Chaudhry Muhammad Asad Ullah is a Pakistani politician who was a Member of the Provincial Assembly of the Punjab, from 2008 to May 2018.

Early life and education
He was born on 4 June 1968 in Jalalpur Bhattian.

He has a degree of Bachelor of Law which he received in 1994 from University of the Punjab.

Political career
He was elected to the Provincial Assembly of the Punjab as a candidate of Pakistan Muslim League (N) (PML-N) from Constituency PP-106 (Hafizabad-II) in 2008 Pakistani general election. He received 40,072 votes and defeated Shaukat Ali Bhatti, a candidate of Pakistan Muslim League (Q) (PML-Q).

He was re-elected to the Provincial Assembly of the Punjab as a candidate of PML-N from Constituency PP-106 (Hafizabad-II) in 2013 Pakistani general election. He received 51,543 votes and defeated an independent candidate, Rai Riasat Ali.

In December 2013, he was appointed as Parliamentary Secretary for food.

References

Living people
Punjab MPAs 2013–2018
1968 births
Pakistan Muslim League (N) politicians
Punjab MPAs 2008–2013